Broadway Historic District is a national historic district located at Cape Vincent in Jefferson County, New York, United States.  The district includes six contributing buildings and one contributing structure; three high style residences and four contributing outbuildings.  Located within the district is the separately listed Vincent LeRay House.

It was listed on the National Register of Historic Places in 1985.

References

Historic districts on the National Register of Historic Places in New York (state)
Historic districts in Jefferson County, New York
National Register of Historic Places in Jefferson County, New York